The Ofayé (also spelled as Opaié or Ofayé) are an indigenous people of Central Brazil. They live along the Paraná River, near the mouth of the Sucuriú River into the headwaters of the Ivinhema and Vacaria Rivers.

Their traditional lands were overtaken by cattle ranchers. Most Ofayé live in a reservation located in the municipality of Brasilândia in the state of Mato Grosso do Sul.

Language
The Ofaye language, a language isolate is severely endangered, and only two people were recorded speaking it in 2005.

Notes

Indigenous peoples in Brazil
Indigenous peoples of Eastern Brazil